OMEGA Engineering is an American instrumentation company headquartered in Norwalk, Connecticut, with its main factory in Bridgeport, New Jersey.

It has sales offices in the United Kingdom, Canada, Germany, China, Brazil, Singapore, Korea, Japan, and Mexico. Local websites are also available for customers in France, Spain, Italy, Denmark, Netherlands, Australia, India, and Chile. OMEGA does business with the United States Navy, NASA and other industrial corporations.

OMEGA has been owned by British-owned conglomerate Spectris plc. since 2011.

History
The company was founded in 1962 by Betty Hollander at her kitchen table while she was raising 4 children. OMEGA began as a thermocouple manufacturer but slowly transitioned to other types of instrumentation. Today, OMEGA manufactures and sells devices that measure everything from temperature to pH.

Hacking
In 1996, Tim Lloyd, an 11-year employee of OMEGA and a network administrator within the company, was fired. Three weeks after he was fired, he unleashed a hacking "time bomb" within OMEGA's computer systems, deleting the software that ran all of OMEGA's manufacturing operations at its factory in Bridgeport, New Jersey. OMEGA spent nearly $2 million repairing the programs and lost nearly $10 million in revenue, resulting in 80 employee layoffs, though Lloyd's lawyer stated that OMEGA's losses were far smaller. Tim Lloyd was convicted of computer sabotage and was sentenced to 41 months in Federal prison. The Tim Lloyd hacking case is considered one of the largest employee sabotage cases in United States business history. The case also aired in a Forensic Files episode "Hack Attack", episode 39 of season 8.

Sale to Spectris
In April 2011, Betty Hollander died, and the company was turned over to her husband Milton Hollander. Later that year, Milton Hollander sold OMEGA Engineering to British-based Spectris plc for $475 million. Then, in March 2017, Spectris was forced to recognize an impairment charge of £115 million with relation to the past acquisition. This charge decreased goodwill and other intangible assets on Spectris' balance sheet. The charge also decreased its 2016 net income.

Sale to Arcline
On April 19, 2022, Spectris announced the sale of Omega Engineering to Arcline Investment Management for $525 million. This was more than $100 million above the Net Book Value subsequent to the goodwill writeoff that Spectris previously took. Spectris announced a $390 million stock buyback as a result of the sale.

References

External links
 http://www2.ca3.uscourts.gov/opinarch/002409.txt US v Lloyd, 3rd Circuit, appeal overturning new trial order and reinstating trial verdict.

1962 establishments in Connecticut
Cybercrime
Sabotage
American companies established in 1962
Manufacturing companies established in 1962
Manufacturing companies based in Connecticut